Archelaus James Opie (1 March 1883 – 20 July 1981) was an Australian rules footballer who played with St Kilda and Carlton in the Victorian Football League (VFL).

Notes

External links 

Jim Opie's profile at Blueseum

1883 births
1981 deaths
Australian rules footballers from Victoria (Australia)		
St Kilda Football Club players
Carlton Football Club players